Mauli Dave (born 3 June 1987) is an Indian singer, actress, dancer, and television host. She was a contestant on Zee TV's Sa Re Ga Ma Pa Challenge 2007. She was also a finalist in Sony Entertainment's Chalo America Boogie Woogie in 2004, and was crowned Miss Teen India Texas 2007. Mauli then decided to move to Mumbai at the age of 19 to pursue a career in music and acting. She hosted a family dance show on the Zee Network titled "Rock n Roll Family" in 2008, lead role in a Zoom Tele-Film "Ek Anhonee", participated in Fear Factor India: Khatron Ke Khiladi season 4 and emerged as the Runner-up. She is from Gujarat.

She was seen in one episode of the Zee TV serial, Parrivaar.

Sa Re Ga Ma Pa Challenge 2007

When Saregamapa, a popular music reality show in India, announced to have auditions internationally in countries like America, Canada, UK, South Africa, U.A.E. and Pakistan; Mauli decided to audition to represent the USA. She went through five to six rounds of auditions in the US and later in Mumbai. She was finally chosen the one to represent the US after her famous rendition of the song "Mayya Mayya." Mauli was mentored by Bappi Lahiri. She eventually reached the top 10.

Discography

Television

Awards and nominations
Crowned "Miss Teen India Texas 2007" –
Stardust Awards 2009–2010: Nominated for "Upcoming Debutant Singer" for the song "Agre Ka Ghaghra" from the film "Jai Veeru”
Music Mirchi Awards 2009–2010: Nominated for "Upcoming Singer Female" for the title song of "Love Ka Tadka.”
Gujarati Garvvati Awards 2010: Won award for "Upcoming Singer”

References

External links
 Youtube playlist
 Opening Night Photos

1987 births
Living people
Indian women playback singers
Sa Re Ga Ma Pa participants
University of Houston alumni
Singers from Ahmedabad
Musicians from Houston
Indian women television presenters
Indian television presenters
21st-century Indian singers
21st-century Indian women singers
Singers from Gujarat
Actresses from Ahmedabad
Women musicians from Gujarat
Fear Factor: Khatron Ke Khiladi participants